Louis of France or Louis de France may refer to:

 Kings of the Franks, of West Francia and of France:
Louis the Pious (died 840), son of Charlemagne, counted as Louis I
Louis the Stammerer (died 879), son of Charles the Bald, counted as Louis II
Louis III of France (died 882)
Louis IV of France (died 954), called Louis d'Outremer
Louis V of France (died 987), called Louis le Fainéant
Louis VI of France (died 1137), called Louis the Fat
Louis VII of France (died 1180), called Louis the Younger
Louis VIII of France (died 1226), called Louis the Lion
Louis IX of France (died 1270), called Saint Louis
Louis X of France (died 1316), called Louis the Quarreller
Louis XI of France (died 1483), called Louis the Prudent
Louis XII of France (died 1515)
Louis XIII of France (died 1643), called Louis the Just
Louis XIV of France (died 1715), called the Sun King and Louis the Great
Louis XV of France (died 1774), called Louis the Beloved
Louis XVI of France (executed 1793)
Louis XVII of France (died 1795), died in prison, never anointed as king
Louis XVIII of France (died 1824), 
Louis XIX of France (died 1844), Louis-Antoine, Duke of Angoulême, nominally king for less than an hour
People other than kings:
Louis of France (1244–1260), oldest son of Louis IX of France
Louis of France (1263–1276), oldest son of Philip III of France
Louis d'Évreux (1276–1319), Count of Évreux, sixth son of Philip III of France
Louis of France (1324–1324), second son of Charles IV of France
Louis of France (1329–1329), second son of Philip VI of France
Louis of France (1330–1330), third son of Philip VI of France
Louis I of Naples (1339–1384), second son of John II of France
Louis of Valois, Duke of Orléans, second son of Charles V of France
Louis, Dauphin of France and Duke of Guyenne, third son of Charles VI of France
Louis of France (1458–1460), oldest son of Louis XI of France
Louis of France (1549–1550), Duke of Orléans, second son of Henry II of France
Louis, Dauphin of France (1661–1711), eldest son of Louis XIV of France
Louis François of France (1672–1672), duke of Anjou, third son of Louis XIV of France
Louis, Dauphin of France (1682–1712), grandson of Louis XIV of France
Louis, Duke of Brittany (1704–1705), great-grandson of Louis XIV of France
Louis, Dauphin of France (1707–1712), great-grandson of Louis XIV of France
Louis, Dauphin of France (1729–1765), son of Louis XV of France
Louis of France (1751–1761), Duke of Burgundy, grandson of Louis XV of France
Louis-Joseph, Dauphin of France (1781–1789), elder son of Louis XVI of France
Louis Alphonse, Duke of Anjou (born 1974), called Louis de Bourbon; current pretender